Choctawhatchee Bay is a bay in the Emerald Coast region of the Florida Panhandle. It is an inlet of the Gulf of Mexico, connected to it through East Pass (also known as Destin Pass). It also connects to Santa Rosa Sound in Fort Walton Beach, Florida to the west and to St. Andrews Bay in Bay County to the east, via the Gulf Intracoastal Waterway. East Pass is the only outlet of the bay flowing directly into the Gulf of Mexico. The Choctawhatchee River flows into Choctawhatchee Bay, as do several smaller rivers and streams. The Mid-Bay Bridge crosses the bay, connecting the city of Destin to Niceville, Florida.

History

The bay was charted by Spanish, French, and English expeditions, The bay appears on some charts as "St. Rose's Bay".

Following the Treaty of Moultrie Creek, small bands of Creeks lived on the shores of Choctawhatchee Bay.

Military Use
As noted in a 1993 Eglin AFB report, Test Area D-55 was originally installed in the World War II era by Eglin Air Force Base with "omnidirectional radar corner reflectors" on top to be used as a radar target range.

Test Area D-55 is formed by 25 arrays of 2,040 wood pilings placed east of the Clyde B. Wells Bridge. They are located in 8 feet of water and the array extends for 1.2 miles.

Municipalities

Several towns and cities are located around the Choctawhatchee Bay:
 Fort Walton Beach
 Destin
 Santa Rosa Beach
 Freeport
 Niceville
 Shalimar
 Valparaiso

Tributaries 
Below are a few of the tributary rivers and bayous that feed into the Choctawhatchee Bay.

Rivers 

 Choctawhatchee River
 Mitchell River
 Black Creek

Bayous 

 LaGrange Bayou
 Alaqua Bayou
 Basin Bayou
 Rocky Bayou
 Boggy Bayou
 Cinco Bayou

Lakes 

 Pippin Lake
 Jack Lake
 Lower Memorial Lake
 Bens Lake
 Lake Lorraine
 Lake Vivian
 Lake Clyde
 Lake Earl

References

Bays of Florida on the Gulf of Mexico
Bodies of water of Okaloosa County, Florida
Bodies of water of Walton County, Florida